Catatinagma kraterella is a moth of the family Gelechiidae. It is found in Russia (the southern Ural, Buryatia and Transbaikalia). The habitat consists of grassy steppe slopes with open, gravelly patches, as well as sandy steppe.

The wingspan is 11–14 mm. The ground colour of the forewings is greyish white, sprinkled with brown-tipped scales, without distinct pattern. The hindwings are pale brown.

Etymology
The species name is derived from Greek krater (meaning crater) and refers to a miniature crater-like structure located on the extended frontal part of the head.

References

Moths described in 2010
Apatetrini
Moths of Asia